Jai Hind (alternatively, Jaihind) is a salutation and slogan that means "Victory to India".

Jai Hind may also refer to:

 Jai Hind (newspaper), an Indian newspaper
 Jaihind (1994 film), a 1994 Indian film
 Jai Hind (2012 film), a 2012 Indian film
 Jai Hind (2019 film), a 2019 Indian film
 JaiHind TV, a Malayalam channel based in Thiruvananthapuram, Kerala, India

See also 
 
 Jaihind 2, a sequel to the 1994 film
 Jay Hind!, an Indian Hindi-language standup comedy show